Jordan Tang Chun-man (born 20 March 1995) is a Hong Kong badminton player. He started playing badminton at the age of seven, and joined the national team when he was 18. He won his first title in the 2016 Chinese Taipei Masters partnering with Tse Ying Suet.

Career 
Tang competed at the 2020 Summer Olympics in the mixed doubles partnering with Tse Ying Suet. They advanced to the bronze medal match, but were defeated by the host pair Yuta Watanabe and Arisa Higashino in straight games.

Achievements

BWF World Championships 
Mixed doubles

Asian Games 
Mixed doubles

BWF World Tour (5 titles, 1 runner-up) 
The BWF World Tour, which was announced on 19 March 2017 and implemented in 2018, is a series of elite badminton tournaments sanctioned by the Badminton World Federation (BWF). The BWF World Tour is divided into levels of World Tour Finals, Super 1000, Super 750, Super 500, Super 300 (part of the HSBC World Tour), and the BWF Tour Super 100.

Mixed doubles

BWF Superseries (1 title, 1 runner-up) 
The BWF Superseries, which was launched on 14 December 2006 and implemented in 2007, was a series of elite badminton tournaments, sanctioned by the Badminton World Federation (BWF). BWF Superseries levels were Superseries and Superseries Premier. A season of Superseries consisted of twelve tournaments around the world that had been introduced since 2011. Successful players were invited to the Superseries Finals, which were held at the end of each year.

Mixed doubles

  BWF Superseries Finals tournament
  BWF Superseries Premier tournament
  BWF Superseries tournament

BWF Grand Prix (1 title, 2 runners-up) 
The BWF Grand Prix had two levels, the Grand Prix and Grand Prix Gold. It was a series of badminton tournaments sanctioned by the Badminton World Federation (BWF) and played between 2007 and 2017.

Mixed doubles

  BWF Grand Prix Gold tournament
  BWF Grand Prix tournament

References

External links 

1995 births
Living people
Hong Kong male badminton players
Badminton players at the 2020 Summer Olympics
Olympic badminton players of Hong Kong
Badminton players at the 2014 Asian Games
Badminton players at the 2018 Asian Games
Asian Games silver medalists for Hong Kong
Asian Games medalists in badminton
Medalists at the 2018 Asian Games
21st-century Hong Kong people